Tyree Cedric Blocker (born 1953) is a retired law enforcement official who rose in the ranks of the Pennsylvania State Police serving as Commissioner from 2015 until his retirement in 2018.

Blocker began his career with the state police as a trooper in 1973 serving in troops F, L and J. In 1985 Blocker received his first promotion to Trooper first class while at troop L. In 1987 Blocker was again promoted to corporal and three years later to sergeant. In 1992 he was then promoted to lieutenant and a year later to captain. In 1996 he was promoted to major overseeing Section III (Delaware Valley area of Pennsylvania). In 2005 Blocker left the state police and was a senior adviser to the Trinidad and Tobago Police Service then later adviser to the minister of national security for the Trinidad and Tobago government. In 2014 Blocker returned to the United States.

In the summer of 2015 Blocker was nominated by governor Tom Wolf to oversee the state's police force. Blocker's nomination passed the Pennsylvania House of Representatives then the Pennsylvania State Senate and on August 3, 2015, Blocker was appointed as the 21st state police commissioner of Pennsylvania.

See also 

 List of Pennsylvania State Police commissioners and superintendents

References 

Living people
1953 births
Pennsylvania State Police
State cabinet secretaries of Pennsylvania
African-American state cabinet secretaries
American state police officers